Niš railway station is a railway station in city of Niš in Nišava District in southern part of Serbia.

Station was opened in 1884. There are several railway lines running from this station; Belgrade-Niš, Niš-Dimitrovgrad, Niš-Skopje and Niš-Prahovo. The train station is located on the western outskirts of the city, on the street Dimitrije Tucovića. 

The original building of the station served until World War II. In 1943, as a strategic object, the Anglo-American air raid was directed against the Nazi occupation of Serbia. The original building was heavily damaged and had to be pulled down after the war. After World War II, a new brutalist check-in hall was built.

References

External links 

Railway stations in Southern and Eastern Serbia
Railway stations opened in 1884
19th-century establishments in Serbia
Niš